Iran first participated at the Universiade in 1973, and has sent athletes to some editions of Summer Universiade.

Medals by Games

Medals by sport

List of medalists

Archery

Athletics

Fencing

Judo

Shooting

Taekwondo

Volleyball

Weightlifting

Wrestling

Wushu

See also 
 Iran at the Olympics
 Iran at the Asian Games

References

External links
FISU

 
Nations at the Universiade
Universiade